7 Days in Life (Traditional Chinese: 隔離七日情) is a 2011 Hong Kong television serial drama produced by TVB.

Characters

Wonderful Harbourview Holiday Hotel residents

Wonderful Harbourview Holiday Hotel staff

Other characters

Lists of comedy-drama television characters
Lists of Hong Kong television series characters